George Flynn (born 1937) is an American composer and pianist.

George Flynn may also refer to:

George Flynn (baseball) (1871–1901), baseball player
George Flynn (movie producer) on Obsessed
George Flynn (trombonist), jazz trombonist on So Damn Happy etc. and Broadway musician
George J. Flynn, commander of Marine Corps Cyberspace Command
George J. Flynn, publisher of Model Rocketry
George W. Flynn, American physical chemist and professor

See also
George Flint (disambiguation)